Wood Township is an inactive township in Wright County, in the U.S. state of Missouri.

Wood Township was erected in 1880, taking its name from the local Wood family.

References

Townships in Missouri
Townships in Wright County, Missouri